K265CA (100.9 FM) is a commercial FM translator radio station located in Albuquerque, New Mexico, broadcasting to the Albuquerque metropolitan area, owned by iHeartMedia, Inc. (formerly Clear Channel Communications).  Its studios are located in Northeast Albuquerque and the transmitter tower is located atop Sandia Crest.

Programming on K265CA is rebroadcast from the second HD Radio subchannel of KZRR (94.1 FM).

History

The translator began broadcasting in 1986 and has always rebroadcast the programming from 104.1 FM. In February 2013, Clear Channel Communications applied to the FCC for an upgrade from 50 watts to the class maximum of 250 watts, while also changing the programming to rebroadcast an HD radio subchannel. The upgrade was made in June 2013, and on August 27, 2013, K265CA had broken off from rebroadcasting KTEG and began airing its own format from KTEG-HD2 playing Christmas music, which began promoting itself as "Santa 100.9" on September 4, being the first station in broadcast radio to flip to Christmas music for the holidays, and setting a record for the earliest any station in the United States has ever flipped to Christmas music before the holiday itself and possibly the longest any terrestrial radio station has ever run that format.

The Christmas music format had aired commercial free for four months, which also put it in direct competition with KMGA, an Adult Contemporary station which usually changes to the all Christmas music format at about mid-November.

On January 2, 2014, at Midnight, K265CA launched a Rhythmic Oldies format branded as "Hot 100.9" that features hip-hop, R&B and dance-pop from the 1980s, 1990s and early 2000s.

In the Spring of 2014, the HD Radio feed switched from KTEG-HD2 to KZRR-HD2, with the programming remaining the same on K265CA.

On November 3, 2014, the rhythmic oldies format moved over to KLQT, re-branding as "Hot 95.1". "Hot" continued to simulcast on 100.9 for more than two months. On January 10, 2015, K265CA began stunting with a loop of Michael Jackson's "Beat It". On January 12, at Noon, K265CA launched an urban contemporary format, branded as "100.9 The Beat".

On December 14, 2018, the urban format and the "Beat" branding were dropped and the station began stunting with Christmas music again as "Santa 100.9". On December 26, at midnight, the station flipped to soft adult contemporary as "100.9 The Breeze."

On January 22, 2021, at midnight, after playing "Endless Love" by Diana Ross and Lionel Richie, K265CA began stunting with a repeated 3-hour loop of various television theme songs. At Noon, the station flipped back to urban, branded as "Power 100.9". The first song on "Power" was "Body" by Megan Thee Stallion. The format returned with a stint of 10,000 songs in a row commercial-free; the change came after the  “Breeze” format had a 0.7 share in the December 2020 Nielsen Audio ratings.

References

External links
Power 100.9 official website

265CA
IHeartMedia radio stations
Mainstream urban radio stations in the United States